Hengshan may refer to the following locations in mainland China or Taiwan:

Mountains
 Mount Heng (Hunan) (衡山)
 Mount Heng (Shanxi) (恒山)
 Mount Heng (Hebei) (恒山, also known as 大茂山)
 Hengshan (Puakua Plateau) (橫山), located in Hsinchu County, Taiwan

Counties and districts
 Hengshan County (衡山县), named after Mount Heng (Hunan)
 Hengshan District, Jixi (恒山区), Heilongjiang
 Hengshan District, Yulin (横山区), Shaanxi

Towns
 Hengshan, Anhui (衡山), in Huoshan County
 Songling, Suzhou, formerly Hengshan (横扇), in Wujiang District, Suzhou, Jiangsu
 Hengshan, Chongqing (横山), in Qijiang District
 Hengshan, Guangning County (横山), Guangdong
 Hengshan, Zhanjiang (横山), in Lianjiang, Guangdong
 Hengshan, Jiangxi (横山), in Guangfeng County
 Hengshan, Shaanxi (横山), seat of Hengshan County
 Hengshan, Zhejiang (横山), in Longyou County

Townships
 Hengshan Township, Guangxi (横山乡), in Luchuan County
 Hengshan Township, Sichuan (横山乡), in Huili County
 Hengshan, Hsinchu (橫山鄉), township of Hsinchu County, Taiwan

Villages
 Hengshan, Bofan, in Bofan, Anlu, Xiaogan, Hubei

Others
 Hengshan Road (衡山路), street in the former French Concession of Shanghai
 Hengshan Commandery (恆山郡), historical commandery in China